{{Infobox college ice hockey team
| team_name             = Penn State Nittany Lions
| current               = 2022–23 Penn State Nittany Lions men's ice hockey season
| image                 = Penn State Nittany Lions hockey logo.svg
| image_size            = 
| university            = Pennsylvania State University
| sex                   = men's
| conference            = Big Ten Conference
| conference_short      = Big Ten
| division              = 
| governing_body        = NCAA
| first_year            = 1909–10
| athletic_director     = Patrick Kraft
| coach                 = Guy Gadowsky

| coach_year            = 12th
| coach_wins            = 172
| coach_losses          = 152
| coach_ties            = 24
| assistant_coaches     = Keith FisherJuliano Pagliero
| captains              = Paul DeNaples 
| a_captains            = Connor MacEachernTyler GrattonConnor McMenaminKevin Wall
| arena                 = Pegula Ice Arena
| capacity              = 6,014
| surface               = 200' x 85'
| location              = University Park, Pennsylvania
| studentsection        = Roar Zone
| fight_song            = Fight On, State
| mascot                = Nittany Lion
| NCAAchampion          = 
| NCAAfrozenfour        = 
| NCAAtourneys          = 2017, 2018, 2023
| conference_tournament = 
ACHA:  1979, 1980, 1989, 1993, 1994, 2008, 2009, 2010, 2011 
 NCAA Division I - Big Ten:  2017| ACHAchampion          = 1984, 1990, 1998, 2000, 2001, 2002, 2003
| ACHAtourneys          = 1982, 1983, 1984, 1985, 1986, 1987, 1988, 1990, 1991, 1993, 1994, 1995, 1996, 1997, 1998, 1999, 2000, 2001, 2002, 2003, 2004, 2005, 2006, 2007, 2008, 2009, 2010, 2011, 2012
| conference_season     = ACHA:  1977, 1978, 1992, 1993, 1994, 2008, 2009, 2010
 NCAA Division I - Big Ten:  2020| uniform_image         = 
}}

Penn State Nittany Lions men's ice hockey, formerly known as the Penn State Icers (the name for the former ACHA team), is a college ice hockey program that represents the Pennsylvania State University. Prior to the 2012–13 season the program was designated a club sport and competed at the ACHA Division I level. PSU was previously a member of the Eastern States Collegiate Hockey League (ESCHL, although the team competed as an independent ACHA D-I member for the 2011–12 season before moving to the NCAA D-I level. They play at the Pegula Ice Arena in University Park, Pennsylvania.

History
Penn State ice hockey was inaugurated in 1938, aside from two games in 1909–10.  Penn State fielded a varsity hockey team for five seasons in the 1940s (1940–44, 1946–47) before the sport was dropped due to limited facilities.

ACHA years
The current program traces its roots back to 1971 when the program was restarted at the non-NCAA level.  Consensus in the ice hockey community considered Penn State to play on a level comparable to NCAA Division III teams, with whom Penn State routinely scheduled games prior to the move to Division I. The Icers also played Division I, in-state opponent Robert Morris.

When the program was resumed in 1971, it began playing a mix of non-NCAA club teams, NAIA teams and DIII teams. In 1975–76 season Penn State became the first college ice hockey team to play in Europe. The team moved to the on-campus Greenberg Ice Pavilion, now known as the Penn State Ice Pavilion, in 1980. The 1,350-seat facility was the home of PSU hockey until 2013.
From 1971 to 2012, Penn State teams won 7 ACHA National Championships, were runners-up 9 times, appeared in 29 ACHA postseason tournaments (including 10 consecutive championship games), won 9 conference playoff titles and recorded 8 conference regular season championships.
 
In the program's final season as a member of the ACHA, the team was led by Guy Gadowsky, who stayed on to coach as the team began play in the NCAA. Gadowsky brought a number of transfers and recruits for the NCAA DI team to prepare for a transition from club to varsity status. The team finished the regular season with a record of 27–4 and received a bid to the 2012 ACHA DI National Tournament as the number one seed and ranked first in the ACHA. In the tournament, the Icers defeated West Virginia 4–1, followed by Oklahoma 6–3. In the semifinal round, Penn State faced Oakland (MI), who were ranked as the thirteenth seed. The game was a rematch of 2007 ACHA championship when the Golden Grizzlies upset the Icers. In a repeat of 2007, Oakland ended Penn State's season and era in the ACHA by a score of 5–3. 
The Icers finished the season with an overall record of 29–5, 29–4 in ACHA competition and a 6–3 loss to NCAA Division II Neumann at Citizens Bank Park in Philadelphia as part of the 2012 NHL Winter Classic events in front of a crowd of 6,800.

Move to NCAA
Over the summer of 2010 it was reported that Penn State athletic director Tim Curley and Terrence Pegula, a PSU alumnus, billionaire hockey fan, and possible large donor visited Minnesota's hockey facilities and the new on-campus Notre Dame Ice Arena currently under construction at Notre Dame and other Central Collegiate Hockey Association (CCHA) schools. Pegula, who would eventually go on to purchase the Buffalo Sabres, donated US$88 million (later upgraded to US$102 million) to the Penn State hockey programs for the purpose of building an arena. In August 2010 Tom Anastos, CCHA commissioner said the CCHA was interested in adding Penn State as a 12th member after Nebraska-Omaha left the league to join the Western Collegiate Hockey Association (WCHA). Without a women's league the women's team would not join the CCHA, speculation had the women's team joining College Hockey America (CHA), currently a 5-team league with teams in Michigan, Pennsylvania and New York.

On September 17, 2010, after years of speculation, it was officially announced the program would move to the National Collegiate Athletic Association (NCAA) Division I level along with the PSU women's ice hockey team starting in the 2012–13 season and the program would initially compete as an independent team until the new arena was completed in 2013. The university also announced the construction of a new 6,000-seat ice arena to replace the undersized and aging 1,350-seat Penn State Ice Pavilion.

Following the announcement by Penn State, the Big Ten Conference announced that the conference planned to begin sponsoring men's ice hockey in the 2013–14 season combining Penn State with Michigan State University, University of Michigan, and Ohio State University from the CCHA as well as the University of Minnesota and the University of Wisconsin from the WCHA to form the six-member Big Ten Hockey Conference.

On March 26, 2015, Casey Bailey became the first Penn State player to play in the National Hockey League, debuting for the Toronto Maple Leafs in a 4–1 loss to the Florida Panthers.

In 2017, Penn State defeated Wisconsin to capture their first Big Ten Tournament Championship. Freshman goaltender Peyton Jones earned the tournament's 2017 Most Outstanding Player Award. Four Nittany Lions made the All-Tournament Team: Jones, forward Liam Folkes, and defensemen Vince Pedrie and Erik Autio. In their first NCAA Tournament game, Penn State notched 10 goals en route to a 10–3 victory. This marked the first time in team history that Penn State scored more than 8 goals in a varsity game. It also marked the most goals scored by a team in an NCAA Tournament game since 1990.

Program record
Prior to NCAA D1 Status

First year: 1909–10
Varsity seasons: 5 (1940–44, 1946–47)
Varsity record: 13–15–1
Non-varsity seasons: 45 (1909–10, 1937–40, 1971–2012)
Non-varsity record: 962–307–44–11
ACHA National Championships: 7 (1984, 1990, 1998, 2000, 2001, 2002, 2003)
ACHA National Runners-Up: 9 (1983, 1985, 1993, 1995, 1999, 2004, 2005, 2006, 2007)

The Roar Zone
The Roar Zone is the official student section for Penn State Men's Ice Hockey. Founded in 2013, the Roar Zone was created when Penn State Hockey became a Division I team and moved play from the Greenburg Ice Pavilion to the newly built Pegula Ice Arena. The Roar Zone became an official Penn State University club in early 2015 and is frequently featured on ESPN and Big Ten Network game coverages.

The Roar Zone holds more than 1,000 students on bleachers built to be the steepest allowed by code. All Penn State Hockey student season ticket holders are members of this organization.

The Roar Zone frequently works with Penn State Athletics to plan away game bus trips to watch conference and non-conference games. Notable trips include a bus trip to watch Penn State play in Madison Square Garden for the first time on January 30, 2016 and Penn State win an overtime win at the Munn Ice Arena on February 13, 2015.

Season-by-season results

Source:

Records vs. Big Ten teams
As of the completion of 2021–22 season

Cumulative record against opponents
Prior to NCAA D1 Status

(1909–10, 1937–44, 1946–47, 1971–2012)

 

❋ Beginning with the 2006–07 season, ties were abolished in favor of deciding overtime ties by the shootout. Overtime losses before the 2006–07 season are reported in the loss column.
† In 1972, 1980, and 1983–85, Penn State won 4 and lost 1 against opponents whose identities have not been retrieved.

Coaches
On April 25, 2011, Penn State named Guy Gadowsky as the program's first NCAA Division I men's hockey coach. Gadowsky was previously the head coach of the Princeton Tigers from 2004 to 2011 and also served as head coach of the Alaska Nanooks from 1999 to 2004. He replaces Scott Balboni, who coached the Icers for five seasons from 2006 to 2011 and compiled a 150–35–8.

NCAA all-time coaching records
As of completion of 2021–22 season

ACHA All-time coaching records
As of completion of 2011–12 season

Statistical leaders
Source:

Career points leaders

Career goaltending leadersGP = Games played; Min = Minutes played; W = Wins; L = Losses; T = Ties; GA = Goals against; SO = Shutouts; SV% = Save percentage; GAA = Goals against average''

minimum 600 minutes played

Statistics current through the start of the 2021–22 season.

Players

Current roster
As of July 30, 2022.

Awards and honors

NCAA

Individual awards

Derek Hines Unsung Hero Award
P. J. Musico: 2015

NCAA Scoring Champion
Alex Limoges: 2019

All-Americans

AHCA Second Team All-Americans

2019–20: Cole Hults, D; Nate Sucese, F

Big Ten

Individual awards

Defensive Player of the Year
Trevor Hamilton: 2018

Coach of the Year
Guy Gadowsky: 2015

Tournament Most Outstanding Player
Peyton Jones: 2016

All-Conference Teams
First Team All-Big Ten

2014–15: Casey Bailey, F
2016–17: Vince Pedrie, D
2017–18: Trevor Hamilton, D
2018–19: Evan Barratt, F

Second Team All-Big Ten

2015–16: Eamon McAdam, G; Vince Pedrie, D

Big Ten All-Rookie Team

2014–15: Scott Conway, F
2015–16: Vince Pedrie, D
2016–17: Peyton Jones, G; Kris Myllari, D; Denis Smirnov, D

Nittany Lions in the NHL
As of June 1, 2022

See also
 Penn State Nittany Lions women's ice hockey

References

External links

 
 Friends of Penn State Men's Hockey
 Roar Zone
 

 
Ice hockey teams in Pennsylvania
Big Ten Conference ice hockey
1909 establishments in Pennsylvania
Ice hockey clubs established in 1909